Digital Ash in a Digital Urn is the seventh studio album by American band Bright Eyes, released on January 25, 2005 by Saddle Creek Records, the same day as their sixth album I'm Wide Awake, It's Morning. It peaked at number 15 in the US and 43 in the UK. In US it has sold 268,000 units. In 2007 it was awarded a gold certification from the Independent Music Companies Association, which indicated sales of at least 100,000 copies throughout Europe. In contrast to the acoustic nature of I'm Wide Awake, It's Morning, Digital Ash in a Digital Urn is more electronic.

Upon release in 2005, the singles "Take It Easy (Love Nothing)" from Digital Ash in a Digital Urn and "Lua" from the album I'm Wide Awake, It's Morning debuted in the top two slots on the Billboard Hot 100 Single Sales chart.

The album was reissued by Dead Oceans alongside a six-track companion EP on November 11, 2022.

Tour
The band achieved success in the charts when the singles "Lua" and "Take It Easy (Love Nothing)" took the top two positions in the Billboard Hot Singles Sales chart in 2004, and in 2005 the band set off on a two-part world tour to promote both I'm Wide Awake, It's Morning, and Digital Ash in a Digital Urn. The first half of the tour promoted the folk-influenced first album, and the latter half featured the more electronic second album. Both records made it into the Top 20 of the Billboard album charts. The tour was captured on Motion Sickness, released later in the year.

The album features contributions from the Yeah Yeah Yeahs' Nick Zinner and the Postal Service's Jimmy Tamborello.

Track listing

Personnel
Note: I'm Wide Awake, It's Morning and Digital Ash in a Digital Urn are the first Bright Eyes albums on which Conor Oberst, Mike Mogis, and Nate Walcott became the three permanent members of Bright Eyes.

Clark Baechle – drums (tracks 2, 9)
Karen Becker – cello (tracks 4, 7)
Jason Boesel – drums (tracks 2, 4–7, 9–12), percussion (tracks 2, 4–7, 9–12)
Donna Carnes – violin (tracks 4, 7)
Digital Audio Engine – programming (tracks 1, 3, 8)
Sabrina Duim – harp (tracks 6, 8, 11)
Thomas Kluge – viola (tracks 4, 7)
Jiha Lee – flute (tracks 6, 11)
Clay Leverett – voice (track 12), drums (tracks 6, 7, 12)
Andy LeMaster – vocals (tracks 2, 9, 12), guitar (tracks 6–9, 12), bass (tracks 6–9, 12), keyboards (tracks 6, 7), additional programming (tracks 6)
Mike Mogis – guitar (tracks 2–4, 6, 7, 10–12), wurlitzer (tracks 1, 3, 10), keyboards, timpani (track 6), chimes (track 11), theremin (track 2), baritone (tracks 2, 9)
Stella Mogis – voice (tracks 1, 9)
Conor Oberst – vocals, guitar (tracks 5–7, 9–11), bass (track 4), piano (track 8), wurlitzer (tracks 2, 4, 5), keyboards (tracks 2, 4, 10, 12), samples (tracks 1, 11), baritone (tracks 3, 5)
Kim Salistean – violin (tracks 4, 7)
Jimmy Tamborello – programming (track 5)
Maria Taylor – vocals (tracks 4, 11, 12)
Nate Walcott – trumpet (track 9), string arrangement (tracks 4, 7)
Nick White – keyboards (tracks 7, 9)
Nick Zinner – guitar (tracks 4, 6–8, 12), keyboards (tracks 4, 5)

Charts

References

External links
Saddle Creek Records
Bright Eyes Plotting Two Distinct Tours, Todd Martens, L.A.

2005 albums
Bright Eyes (band) albums
Saddle Creek Records albums
Albums produced by Mike Mogis
Electropop albums
Electronica albums by American artists
Synth-pop albums by American artists
Experimental music albums by American artists
Intelligent dance music albums